The Bukovina Day is a public holiday of Romania celebrated every 28 November that commemorates the decision of the General Congress of Bukovina to unite the region of Bukovina with the Kingdom of Romania on 28 November 1918.

Background

Bukovina had belonged to the Romanian principality of Moldavia until 1774, when it was occupied by the Habsburg monarchy. It would not be until 1918 when the region would join Romania, but in 1940, Northern Bukovina, together with Bessarabia, was forcibly ceded to the Soviet Union.

Holiday proposal
The day was promulgated as a public holiday by Law No. 250/2015 by the President of Romania, Klaus Iohannis, on 28 October 2015. The Senate of Romania had already accepted the proposal on 2 October 2013, while the Chamber of Deputies approved it only on 7 October 2015. The proposal was initiated by the deputy .

Observance
During the Bukovina Day, local authorities and public institutions, who may be given a budget, are allowed to organize cultural and scientific events.

The day is celebrated by the local authorities and population of various cities, towns and villages mostly in the Romanian part of Bukovina, such as Rădăuți, Suceava, Putna Vatra Dornei, and Câmpulung Moldovenesc, but also in Chernivtsi, in Ukraine. However, the day is also celebrated in other parts of Romania; in 2019, the city of Bacău organized a cultural event together with ethnic Romanian teachers and students from Northern Bukovina, the Ukrainian part of the territory.

On 28 November 2019, the Prime Minister of Romania Ludovic Orban announced that a project of more than 240 million euros would be approved to improve the infrastructure of Suceava County. This was interpreted as a "gift" from the Romanian Government for the Bukovina Day.

See also
Public holidays in Romania
Dobruja Day
Oltenia Day
Great Union Day
Romanians in Ukraine

References

Bukovina
Great Union (Romania)
Annual events in Romania
Autumn events in Romania
Observances in Romania
November observances
Public holidays in Romania
2015 establishments in Romania
Romanians in Ukraine